Adelio Moro (born 14 April 1951 in Mozzanica) is an Italian professional football coach and a former player who played as a central midfielder.

Playing career
Moro began his career at Atalanta and came to prominence after their return to Serie A in 1971. He became known as a skilful midfielder with an eye for goal, and joined Inter Milan the following year. A season at Verona followed, before a move to Ascoli in 1977.

At Ascoli, he formed a formidable midfield partnership with Gianfranco Bellotto and Alessandro Scanziani between 1979 and 1981, scoring a large proportion of the team's goals over those two seasons, and leading the side to their highest-ever finish in the league, a fifth place in 1980. Spells at Milan and Cesena followed before a brief return to Atalanta.

Honours
Milan
 Mitropa Cup winner: 1982.

External links

1951 births
Living people
Italian footballers
Italy under-21 international footballers
Serie A players
Serie B players
Atalanta B.C. players
U.S. Cremonese players
Inter Milan players
Hellas Verona F.C. players
Ascoli Calcio 1898 F.C. players
A.C. Milan players
A.C. Cesena players
Italian football managers
Brescia Calcio managers
L.R. Vicenza managers
Association football midfielders